Mosteiros is a civil parish in the municipality of Ponta Delgada on the Portuguese island of São Miguel in the Azores. It contains the localities Chã das Machadas, Lomba dos Homens, Lombinha and Mosteiros.

History
It was only around 1480, that the first people began to settle this part of the island, mostly by the maritime access, for many years. The community of Mosteiros was built on ancestral fishing for many years, even as its territory was cultivated by farmers.

The name Mosteiros, meaning monastery in the Portuguese language, refers to nearby islets: the largest of these islets is shaped like a church. As Gaspar Frutuoso noted: 
"Between the large islet and ponta Ruiva, by the cliffs, until the promontory of Escalvados, there are some large depressions and well made fumaroles, in the form of a church, or monasteries, or of both things, that older settlers called the monasteries [Mosteiros], situated on the fajã that ran from the peak in Sete Cidades".

The parochial church, dedicated to Our Lady of the Conception, was constructed at various stages and remotes the beginning of the 17th century.

Today, these activities have been complemented by tourist-related activities.

Geography
Mosteiros is located in the northwestern part of the island of São Miguel, connected by the Estrada Regional 1-1ª roadway to Ponta Delgada in the southeast and Ribeira Grande in the northeast. The main village is located on a fajã at the tip of the island, surrounded by coastal cliffs that reach . The parish is primarily recognizable by a group of islets that lie offshore: two small islets to the northwest, and a group in the southwest, including one further west and two smaller islets, slightly east of the large islet.

The development of the community has been highlighted by the construction of two triatos or impérios, associated with Cult of the Holy Spirit: the Impéro da Grota (located in the garden near the main Church) and the Império das Lombas (raised over the old structure). In addition, several reparations were completed on the school Escola Comendador Ângelo José Dias, the seat of the parish, philharmonic band and extension of the ETAR (sewage and drainage). The Jardim da Eira Velha, a greenspace in the community was also elaborated, overlooking the sea and fishing port, in addition to the changing rooms of the football field.

The conclusion of the Caminho da Pedra Queimada, which connects the Rua das Pensões to the regional roadway (at Lomba dos Homens) was part of an attempt to improve the community's access. This was also the case with the paving and extensions of the Caminho do Concelho, which connects the Ramal dos Mosteiros to Pico de Mafra. Another solution defended by the parish council was the opening of a new road along the cliffs to the top of Rua das Vinhas until Rua Nova, a solution that has the foresight of providing new residential homes.

Climate

Economy
Agriculture dominates in the interior, with herding of dairy cattle and the cultivation of some fruits and vegetables.

Culture
The festivities in honour of the patron saint occur on the third Sunday of August.

References
Notes

Sources
 

Parishes of Ponta Delgada